There have been newspapers in North Carolina since the North-Carolina Gazette began publication in the Province of North Carolina in 1751. As of January 2020, there were approximately 260 newspapers in publication in North Carolina. While printed newspaper circulation has declined in the last 10 years, the total paid print circulation of newspapers in North Carolina is over 4 million.  The newspapers with the largest paid circulation are The Charlotte Observer and The News & Observer of Raleigh. The largest number of North Carolina newspapers are focused on local news at the county level. In addition to print versions of North Carolina newspapers, most newspapers have online websites, as well as Facebook and Twitter accounts for distribution of news media and interacting with their community.

List of newspapers

There were approximately 260 North Carolina newspapers in publication at the beginning of 2020.   The Fayetteville Observer (established in 1816) is the oldest newspaper in North Carolina.  The Star-News of Wilmington (established in 1867) is the oldest continuously running newspaper.  Many of the newspapers in North Carolina have common parent companies, including Adams Publishing Group, Berkshire Hathaway, Champion Media, Community News Holdings, Inc. (CNHI), Gannett, and McClatchy. Many of the newspapers are also members of the North Carolina Publishing Association. Print frequency varies from daily to monthly. Most newspapers use Facebook and Twitter for distribution of content.  Most college and universities in North Carolina have student newspapers.  There is one Chinese (The China Press Weekly) and three Spanish language newspapers, La Conexión being the oldest in North Carolina.

Daily newspapers

There are 45 North Carolina newspapers that are published in print editions at least five days a week, as of the beginning of 2019.

College newspapers

There are 24 North Carolina college newspapers that are published during the academic year.

Special interest newspapers

Currently, there are 15 special interest newspapers in North Carolina covering religious, Native American, African-American, LGBT, and military perspectives on the news.

Foreign language newspapers
Currently, there are five North Carolina newspapers published in languages other than English.

Other newspapers
Currently, there are 172 North Carolina newspapers not covered by the above categories, including weekly and monthly print publication frequencies.

{| class="wikitable sortable plainrowheaders" summary="List of other current North Carolina newspapers"
|+ Other current newspapers in North Carolina
|-
! Title
! City
!County
! Year established
! Current Print Frequency
! Parent Company or Publisher
! References
|-
!scope="row" style="text-align: left;"|AC Phoenix, The
|Winston-Salem
|Forsyth
|1982
|Monthly
|unknown
|align=center|
|-
!scope="row" style="text-align: left;"|Alamance News, The
|Graham
|Alamance
|1875
|Weekly
|News, Inc.
|align=center|
|-
!scope="row" style="text-align: left;"|Alleghany News, The
|Sparta
|Alleghany
|1889
|Weekly
|Alleghany Holdings, LLC
|align=center|
|-
!scope="row" style="text-align: left;"|Anson Record, The
| Wadesboro
|Anson
| 1881
| Weekly
| Champion Media
|align=center|
|-
!scope="row" style="text-align: left;"|Archdale Trinity News, The
|Archdale
|Randolph
|1978
|Weekly
|Melinda Lamb
|align=center|
|-
!scope="row" style="text-align: left;"|Ashe Post & Times
| West Jefferson
|Ashe
| 1925
| Semi-Weekly (Tues., Fri)
|Adams Publishing Group
|align=center|
|-
!scope="row" style="text-align: left;"|Asheville Advocate
|Asheville
|Buncombe
|1987
|Bi-Weekly
|C & A Enterprises
|align=center|
|-
!scope="row" style="text-align: left;"|Asheville Global Report
|Asheville
|Buncombe
| 1999-2011
|Weekly
|Asheville Global Report
|align=center|
|-
!scope="row" style="text-align: left;"|Asheville Tribune
|Asheville
|Buncombe
| 
| 
| 
|align=center|
|-
!scope="row" style="text-align: left;"|Avery Journal-Times
|Newland
|Avery
|1959
|Weekly
|Adams Publishing Group
|align=center|
|-
!scope="row" style="text-align: left;"|Banner News
|Belmont
|Gaston
|1995
|Weekly
|Republic Newspapers, Inc.
|align=center|
|-
!scope="row" style="text-align: left;"|Belmont Banner, The
|Belmont
|Gaston
| 19??
|Weekly
|B. Arp Lowrance
|align=center|
|-
!scope="row" style="text-align: left;"|Bertie Ledger-Advance
|Windsor
|Bertie
|1930
|Weekly
|Adams Publishing Group, Parker Bros.
|align=center|
|-
!scope="row" style="text-align: left;"|Bessemer City Record
|Kings Mountain, Bessemer City
|Cleveland, Gaston
|1989
|Weekly
|Republic Newspapers, Inc.
|align=center|
|-
!scope="row" style="text-align: left;"|Biltmore Beacon
|Asheville
|Buncombe
| 
| weekly
| Mountaineer Publishing Company
|align=center|
|-
!scope="row" style="text-align: left;"|Black Mountain News
| Black Mountain
|Buncombe
| 1945
| Weekly
|Thomas Claybaugh
|align=center|
|-
!scope="row" style="text-align: left;"|Bladen Journal, The
| Elizabethtown
|Bladen
| 1898 
| bi-weekly
| Champion Media
|align=center|
|-
!scope="row" style="text-align: left;"|Blowing Rocket, The
|Blowing Rock
|Watauga/ Caldwell
|1932
|Weekly, Thurs.
|Adams Publishing Group
|align=center|
|-
!scope="row" style="text-align: left;"|Blue Ridge Sun, The
|Sparta
|Alleghany
|1979
|Weekly
|Milly B. Richardson, Kathy Wagner
|align=center|
|-
!scope="row" style="text-align: left;"|Brunswick Beacon
|Shallotte
|Brunswick
|1962
|Weekly
|Landmark Media Enterprises
|align=center|
|-
!scope="row" style="text-align: left;"|Bulletin, The
|Ramseur
|Randolph
|1994
|Weekly
|Randolph Pub. Co.
|align=center|
|-
!scope="row" style="text-align: left;"|Butner-Creedmoor News, The
|Creedmoor
|Granville
|1965
|Weekly
|Restoration Newsmedia
|align=center|
|-
!scope="row" style="text-align: left;"|Caldwell Informer
|Granite Falls
|Caldwell
|198?
|Weekly
|David C. Hollar
|align=center|
|-
!scope="row" style="text-align: left;"|Carolina Journal
|Raleigh
|Wake
|1991
|Monthly
|John Locke Foundation
|align=center|
|-
!scope="row" style="text-align: left;"|Carolinian, The
|Raleigh
|Wake
|1920 or 1940
|Semi-Weekly
|Unknown
|align=center|
|-
!scope="row" style="text-align: left;"|Carteret County News-Times
|Morehead City
|Carteret
|
|M,W,Su
|Walter Phillips and Lockwood Phillips
|align=center|
|-
!scope="row" style="text-align: left;"|Cary News, The
|Cary
|Wake
| 196?
|Semi-Weekly
|Sample Pub. Co.
|align=center|
|-
!scope="row" style="text-align: left;"|Caswell Citizen, The
|Yanceyville
|Caswell
| 198?
|Weekly
|CHN Communications Corp.
|align=center|
|-
!scope="row" style="text-align: left;"|Caswell Messenger, The
| Yanceyville
|Caswell
| before 1945
| weekly
| Womack Publishing Company
|align=center|
|-
!scope="row" style="text-align: left;"|Chapel Hill News, The
|Chapel Hill
|Orange
|1992
|Semi-Weekly
|Robert W. Parks
|align=center|
|-
!scope="row" style="text-align: left;"|Charlotte Weekly Uptown, The
|Charlotte
|Mecklenburg
| 19??
|Weekly
|Weekly Newspapers, Inc.
|align=center|
|-
!scope="row" style="text-align: left;"|Chatham Journal
| Siler City
|Chatham
| 1996
| 
| 
|align=center|
|-
!scope="row" style="text-align: left;"|Chatham News, The
| Siler City
|Chatham
| 1924
| Weekly
| The Chatham Media Group LLC
|align=center|
|-
!scope="row" style="text-align: left;"|Chatham Record, The
| Pittsboro
|Chatham
| 1878
| weekly
| The Chatham Media Group LLC
|align=center|
|-
|-
!scope="row" style="text-align: left;"|Cherokee Scout
| Murphy
|Cherokee
|1889
|Weekly (Wed.)
| CNHI
|align=center|
|-
!scope="row" style="text-align: left;"|Cherokee Sentinel
| Murphy
|Cherokee
| 
| 
| 
|align=center|
|-
!scope="row" style="text-align: left;"|Chowan Herald, The
|Edenton
|Chowan
|1934
|Weekly
|Adams Publishing Group
|align=center|
|-
!scope="row" style="text-align: left;"|Clay County Progress
| Hayesville
|Clay
| 
| Weekly, Thurs.
| CNHI
|align=center|
|-
!scope="row" style="text-align: left;"|Cleveland County Journal, The
|Lawndale
|Cleveland
| 198?
|Weekly
|Steve Howard Martin
|align=center|
|-
!scope="row" style="text-align: left;"|Cleveland Times, The
|Shelby
|Cleveland
|1941
|Weekly
|Cleveland Times Co.
|align=center|
|-
!scope="row" style="text-align: left;"|Coastland Times, The
|Manteo
|Dare
|1973
|Tue, Thurs., Sun.
|Times Print. Co.
|align=center|
|-
!scope="row" style="text-align: left;"|County News, The
|Statesville
|Iredell
|1997
|Weekly
|M. McCullough
|align=center|
|-
!scope="row" style="text-align: left;"|Courier-Times, The
|Roxboro
|Person
|1943
|Weekly
|Roxboro Newsmedia
|align=center|
|-
!scope="row" style="text-align: left;"|Creative Loafing
|Charlotte
|Mecklenburg
| 1987
|Weekly
|unknown
|align=center| 
|-
!scope="row" style="text-align: left;"|Crossroads Chronicle
| Cashiers
|Jackson
| 
| 
| CNHI
|align=center|
|-
!scope="row" style="text-align: left;"|Dispatch
|Raleigh
|Wake
|1991
|Weekly
|Carolinian Pub. Co.
|align=center|
|-
!scope="row" style="text-align: left;"|Danbury Reporter,  The
|Danbury
|Stokes
| 189?
|Weekly
|unknown
|align=center|
|-
!scope="row" style="text-align: left;"|Davie County Enterprise-Record, The
| Mocksville
|Davie
| 1899
|Weekly
|Boone Newspapers
|align=center|
|-
!scope="row" style="text-align: left;"|Denton Orator, The
|Denton
|Davidson
| 1995
|Weekly
|unknown
|align=center|
|-
!scope="row" style="text-align: left;"|Duplin Times Progress Sentinel
|Kenansville
|Duplin
|1963
|Weekly
|Adams Publishing Group, Duplin Pub. Co.
|align=center|
|-
!scope="row" style="text-align: left;"|Eagle, The
|Cherryville
|Gaston
| 190?
|Weekly
|Eagle Pub. Co.
|align=center|
|-
!scope="row" style="text-align: left;"|East Carolina Reminder, The
|Columbia
|Tyrrell
|1982
|Weekly
|Columbia Print. Co.
|align=center|
|-
!scope="row" style="text-align: left;"|Eden Daily News
|Eden
|Rockingham
|2002
|Bi-weekly
|Berkshire Hathaway
|align=center|
|-
!scope="row" style="text-align: left;"|Enquirer-Journal, The
|Monroe
|Union
|1975
|Semi-Weekly (Tue, Thurs., Sat.)
|Enquirer Pub. Co.
|align=center|
|-
!scope="row" style="text-align: left;"|Enterprise, The
|Spring Hope
|Nash
|2018
|Weekly
|Unknown
|align=center|
|-
!scope="row" style="text-align: left;"|Farmville Enterprise, The
|Farmville
|Pitt
|1910
|Weekly
|Adams Publishing Group, A.C. Monk
|align=center|
|-
!scope="row" style="text-align: left;"|Four Oaks News, The
|Four Oaks
|Johnston
|1973
|Weekly
|Hockaday Print. Co.
|align=center|
|-
!scope="row" style="text-align: left;"|Franklin Press, The
| Franklin
|Macon
| 
| 
| CNHI
|align=center|
|-
!scope="row" style="text-align: left;"|Franklin Times, The
|Louisburg
|Franklin
|1870
|Weekly
|James A. Thomas
|align=center|
|-
!scope="row" style="text-align: left;"|Fuquay-Varina Independent
|Fuquay-Varina
|Wake
|1994
|Weekly
|Kirkland Newspapers, Inc.
|align=center|
|-
!scope="row" style="text-align: left;"|Gates County Index
|Gatesville
|Gates
|193?
|Weekly
|Parker Bros.
|align=center|
|-
!scope="row" style="text-align: left;"|Graham Sentinel
| Robbinsville
|Graham
| 
| 
| 
|align=center|
|-
!scope="row" style="text-align: left;"|Graham Star, The
| Robbinsville
|Graham
|
| Weekly
| CNHI
|align=center|
|-
!scope="row" style="text-align: left;"|Greensboro Patriot, The
|Greensboro
|Guilford
|200?
|Weekly
|Patriot Pub. Co.
|align=center|
|-
!scope="row" style="text-align: left;"|Grey Area News
| Zebulon
|Wake, Eastern North Carolina
| 2011
| 
| Frank Whatley
|align=center|
|-
!scope="row" style="text-align: left;"|Hatteras Monitor
|FriscoMessenger,
|Dare
|1986
|Monthly
|Richard Jones
|align=center|
|-
!scope="row" style="text-align: left;"|Havelock News
| Havelock
|Craven
| 
| Weekly
| GateHouse Media
|align=center|
|-
!scope="row" style="text-align: left;"|Havelock Progress, The
|Havelock
|Craven
| 19??
|Weekly
|Havelock Progress Pub. Co.
|align=center|
|-
!scope="row" style="text-align: left;"|Havelock Times, The
|Havelock
|Craven
|1995
|Weekly
|Carteret Pub. Co.
|align=center|
|-
!scope="row" style="text-align: left;"|Highlander, The
| Highlands
|Macon/ Jackson
| 1958
| Weekly
| CNHI
|align=center|
|-
!scope="row" style="text-align: left;"|Independent, The
|Robbinsville
|Graham
|1991
|Weekly
|G. Russell Wiggins
|align=center|
|-
!scope="row" style="text-align: left;"|Independent Tribune
| Concord
|Cabarrus
| 1883
| 3 days a week
| Berkshire Hathaway
|align=center|
|-
!scope="row" style="text-align: left;"|Indy Week
|Durham
|Durham/ Wake
|1983
|Weekly
|ZM INDY, Inc.
|align=center|
|-
!scope="row" style="text-align: left;"|Island Free Press
| Hatteras, Ocracoke
|Dare, Hyde
| 2007
| 
| Donna Barnett
|align=center|
|-
!scope="row" style="text-align: left;"|Island Gazette
|Carolina Beach
|New Hanover
|1978
|Weekly
|Seaside Press Co.
|align=center|
|-
!scope="row" style="text-align: left;"|Jamestown News
|Jamestown
|Guilford
|1978
|Weekly
|Womack Newspapers, Inc.
|align=center|
|-
!scope="row" style="text-align: left;"|Johnstonian-Sun, The
|Selma
|Johnston
| 192?
|Weekly
|Sun Pub. Co.
|align=center|
|-
!scope="row" style="text-align: left;"|Jones Post, The
|Trenton
|Jones
| 197?
|Weekly
|Ashley B. Futrell, Jr.
|align=center|
|-
!scope="row" style="text-align: left;"|Kannapolis Citizen
| Kannapolis
|Cabarrus/ Rowan
| 2003 (ceased print publication by 2010}
| Facebook only
| Salisbury Post
|align=center|
|-
!scope="row" style="text-align: left;"|Kernersville News
|Kernersville
|Forsyth
| 19??
|Weekly
|Fred P. Carter
|align=center|
|-
!scope="row" style="text-align: left;"|Kenly News
|Kenly
|Johnston
|1973
|Weekly
|Lawrence Newspapers, Inc.
|align=center|
|-
!scope="row" style="text-align: left;"|Kings Mountain Herald
|Kings Mountain
|Cleveland
|1979
|Weekly
|General Pub. Co.
|align=center|
|-
!scope="row" style="text-align: left;"|Knightdale Times
|Zebulon
|Wake
|1999
|Weekly
|Gold Leaf Pub., Inc.
|align=center|
|-
!scope="row" style="text-align: left;"|Lake Gaston Gazette-Observer
| Littleton
|Warren
| 1955
| Weekly (Wed.)
| Womack Publishing Company
|align=center|
|-
!scope="row" style="text-align: left;"|Lake Norman Times
|Denver
|Lincoln
|1993
|Weekly
|Womack Pub. Co.
|align=center|
|-
!scope="row" style="text-align: left;"|Leader, The
|Research Triangle Park
|Orange
|1979
|Weekly
|Capitol Publications
|align=center|
|-
!scope="row" style="text-align: left;"|Liberty News, The
|Liberty
|Randolph
|1950
|Weekly
|L.T. James
|align=center|
|-
!scope="row" style="text-align: left;"|Lincoln Times-News
| Lincolnton
|Lincoln
| 1873
| Semi-Weekly (Mon., Wed., Fri.)
|
|align=center|
|-
!scope="row" style="text-align: left;"|Littleton Observer, The
|Littleton
|Warren
|1955
|Weekly
|Ruth Mincher
|align=center|
|-
!scope="row" style="text-align: left;"|M' Voice, The
|Greenville
|Pitt
|1987
|Weekly
|Jim Rouse & Sons
|align=center|
|-
!scope="row" style="text-align: left;"|Macon County News
| Franklin
|Macon
| 1980s
| 
| Gooder
|align=center|
|-
!scope="row" style="text-align: left;"|Martin County Enterprise & Weekly Herald
| Williamston
|Martin
| 2012
| Semi-Weekly (Tue., Fri.)
| Adams Publishing Group, Cooke Communications
|align=center|
|-
!scope="row" style="text-align: left;"|Mebane Enterprise
| Mebane
|Alamance/ Orange
| 1908
| 
| Womack Publishing Company
|align=center|
|-
!scope="row" style="text-align: left;"|Mecklenburg Gazette, The
|Davidson
|Mecklenburg
| 19??
|Weekly
|W. Taylor Blackwell
|align=center|
|-
!scope="row" style="text-align: left;"|Messenger, The
|Madison
|Rockingham
|1943
|Semi-Weekly
|Madison Pub. Co.
|align=center|
|-
!scope="row" style="text-align: left;"|Mitchell News-Journal
| Spruce Pine
|Mitchell
| 
| 
| CNHI
|align=center|
|-
!scope="row" style="text-align: left;"|Montgomery Herald
|Troy
|Polk
| 19??
|Weekly
|Charlie Manning
|align=center|
|-
!scope="row" style="text-align: left;"|Mooresville Tribune
| Mooresville
|Rowan
| 1940
| Weekly
| Berkshire Hathaway
|align=center|
|-
!scope="row" style="text-align: left;"|Mount Olive Tribune
| Mount Olive
|Wayne/ Duplin
| 
| Weekly
| Restoration Newsmedia
|align=center|
|-
!scope="row" style="text-align: left;"|Mountain Times
|Boone
|Watauga
|1978
|Weekly, Thurs.
|Adams Publishing Group
|align=center|
|-
!scope="row" style="text-align: left;"|Mountain Xpress
|Asheville
|Buncombe
|
| Weekly
|
|align=center|
|-
!scope="row" style="text-align: left;"|Mountaineer, The
| Waynesville
|Haywood
| 
| Semi-Weekly (Mon., Wed., Fri.)
| 
|align=center|
|-
!scope="row" style="text-align: left;"|Nashville Graphic, The
|Nashville
|Edgecombe
|1988
|Semi-Weekly (Wed., Fri.)
|Graphic Publications
|align=center|
|-
!scope="row" style="text-align: left;"|News-Herald, The
|Ahoskie
|Hertford
| 19??
|Tri-weekly
|Park Newspapers of Northeastern North Carolina, Inc.
|align=center|
|-
!scope="row" style="text-align: left;"|News-Journal, The
|Raeford
|Hoke
|1929
|Weekly
|Paul Dickson
|align=center|
|-
!scope="row" style="text-align: left;"|News of Orange County, The
| Hillsborough
|Orange
| 
| Weekly
| Womack Publishing Company
|align=center|
|-
!scope="row" style="text-align: left;"|News-Record, The
|Marshall
|Madison
|1911
|Weekly
|Western Carolina Print. Co.
|align=center|
|-
!scope="row" style="text-align: left;"|News Reporter, The
|Whiteville
|Columbus
|1905
|Semi-Weekly
|Columbus County Trucker's Reporter Co.
|align=center|
|-
!scope="row" style="text-align: left;"|North Carolina Gazette
| Charlotte
|Mecklenburg
| 
| 
| 
|align=center|
|-
!scope="row" style="text-align: left;"|North Carolina Telegraph
|Goldsboro
|Wayne
|1850
|Weekly
|W.F.S. Alston & F.C. Patrick
|align=center|
|-
!scope="row" style="text-align: left;"|North Meck Newspaper
|Charlotte
|Mecklenburg
|1978
|Weekly
|Stan Kaplan
|align=center|
|-
!scope="row" style="text-align: left;"|North State Journal
| Raleigh
|Wake
| 2016
|
| North State Media, LLC
|align=center|
|-
!scope="row" style="text-align: left;"|Ocracoke Observer
| Ocracoke
|Hyde
| 1999
| Daily online coverage; Monthly print edition March–December
| Self-published
|align=center|
|-
!scope="row" style="text-align: left;"|Oxford Public Ledger
|Oxford
|Granville
|1919
|Weekly
|Ledger Pub. Co.
|align=center|
|-
!scope="row" style="text-align: left;"|Pamlico Scoop, The
|Washington
|Beaufort
|1989
|Monthly
|Friends Publishers
|align=center|
|-
!scope="row" style="text-align: left;"|Pamlico News, The
|Bayboro
|Beaufort, Pamlico
|1968/1977
|Weekly
|Henry Winfrey
|align=center| 
|-
!scope="row" style="text-align: left;"|Paraglide, The
|Raeford
|Cumberland
|1973
|Weekly
|Dickson Press
|align=center|
|-
!scope="row" style="text-align: left;"|Pender-Topsail Post & Voice
|Hamstead
|Pender
|1991
|Weekly
|Carteret Publishing Co, Inc.
|align=center|
|-
!scope="row" style="text-align: left;"|Perquimans Weekly, The
|Hertford
|Perquimans
|1934
|Weekly
|Adams Publishing Group
|align=center|
|-
!scope="row" style="text-align: left;"|Pilot, The
|Vass
|Moore
|1920
|Semi-Weekly
|Pilot Print. Co.
|align=center|
|-
!scope="row" style="text-align: left;"|Pilot, The
| Pilot Mountain
|Surry
|
| Weekly
| Adams Publishing Group, Civitas Media Group, Champion Media
|align=center|
|-
!scope="row" style="text-align: left;"|Princeton News Leader
|Princeton
|Johnston
|1983
|Weekly
|Merrill Pub. Co.
|align=center|
|-
!scope="row" style="text-align: left;"|Proclamation, The
|Burlington
|Alamance
|2006
|Bi-Monthly
|MEJ Consulting Enterprises, Inc.
|align=center|
|-
!scope="row" style="text-align: left;"|Randleman Reporter
|Randleman
|Randolph
|1986
|Weekly
|Womack Pub. Co.
|align=center|
|-
!scope="row" style="text-align: left;"|Randolph Guide, The
|Asheboro
|Randolph
|1954
|Weekly
|Paul G. Cutrigh
|align=center|
|-
!scope="row" style="text-align: left;"|Rant, The
| Sanford
|Lee
| 2008
| Monthly
| LPH Media LLC
|align=center|
|-
!scope="row" style="text-align: left;"|Reidsville Review, The
| Reidsville
|Rockingham
| 1888
| Bi-Weekly
| Berkshire Hathaway
|align=center|
|-
!scope="row" style="text-align: left;"|Richlands-Beulaville Advertiser News
|Richlands
|Duplin
| 197?
|Weekly
|Duplin-Onslow Pub. Co.
|align=center|
|-
!scope="row" style="text-align: left;"|Roanoke-Chowan News-Herald
| Ahoskie
|Hertford
| 1914
| Semi-Weekly (Wed., Sat.)
| Boone Newspapers, Inc.
|align=center|
|-
!scope="row" style="text-align: left;"|Roanoke Beacon, The
|Plymouth
|Washington
|1959
|Weekly
|Roanoke Beacon, Inc.
|align=center|
|-
!scope="row" style="text-align: left;"|Robco News
|Lumberton
|Robeson
|1984
|Semi-Weekly
|Robco News, Inc.
|align=center|
|-
!scope="row" style="text-align: left;"|Rockingham Now
|Reidsville
|Rockingham
|2019
|Semi-Weekly
|unknown
|align=center|
|-
!scope="row" style="text-align: left;"|Smithfield Herald, The
|Smithfield
|Johnston
| 188?
|Semi-Weekly (Tue., Fri.)
|Samuel Booker
|align=center|
|-
!scope="row" style="text-align: left;"|Smoky Mountain News
| Waynesville
|Haywood
|
|Weekly (Wed.)
| Smoky Mountain News Inc.
|align=center|
|-
!scope="row" style="text-align: left;"|Smoky Mountain Times
| Bryson City
|Swain
| 1883
| Weekly
| CNHI
|align=center|
|-
!scope="row" style="text-align: left;"|Spectrum
|Jacksonville
|Onslow
|1984
|Weekly
|Shopco Pub. Co.
|align=center|
|-
!scope="row" style="text-align: left;"|St. Pauls Review, The
|St. Pauls
|Robeson
| 192?
|Weekly
|Community Media
|align=center|
|-
!scope="row" style="text-align: left;"|Standard, The]]|Snow Hill
|Greene, Pitt
|
|Weekly
|Adams Publishing Group
|align=center|
|-
!scope="row" style="text-align: left;"|Stanly News and Press, The| Albemarle
|Stanly
| 1880
| Tue., Thurs., Sun.
| Community Newspaper Holdings, Inc. (CNHI)
|align=center|
|-
!scope="row" style="text-align: left;"|State Port Pilot, The| Southport
|Brunswick
| 1928
| 
| 
|align=center|
|-
!scope="row" style="text-align: left;"|Stokes News, The| King
|Stokes/ Forsyth
| 1872
| Weekly
| Adams Publishing Group
|align=center|
|-
!scope="row" style="text-align: left;"|Sylva Herald and Ruralite, The| Sylva
|Jackson
| 1926
| 
| 
|align=center|
|-
!scope="row" style="text-align: left;"|Tabor-Loris Tribune|Tabor City
|Columbus
|1991
|Weekly
|Atlantic Pub. and Paper Co.
|align=center|
|-
!scope="row" style="text-align: left;"|Tarboro Weekly|Tarboro
|Edgecombe
|2014
|Weekly (Wed.)
|Adams Publishing Group
|align=center|
|-
!scope="row" style="text-align: left;"|Taylorsville Times|Taylorsville
|Alexander
|1886
|Weekly
|Lee & Jane Sharpe
|align=center|
|-
!scope="row" style="text-align: left;"|Thomasville Times, The|Thomasville
|Davidson
|1989
|Tri-weekly
|High Point Enterprise, Inc.
|align=center|
|-
!scope="row" style="text-align: left;"|Tideland News|Swansboro
|Onslow
|1979
|Weekly
|Double H Co.
|align=center|
|-
!scope="row" style="text-align: left;"|Times-Leader, The|Grifton
|Pitt
|1994
|Weekly
|Mitchell Oakley
|align=center|
|-
!scope="row" style="text-align: left;"|Topsail Times, The|Surf City
|Onslow, Pender
|2021
|Bi-Weekly
|None
|
|-
!scope="row" style="text-align: left;"|Transylvania Times, The|Brevard
|Transylvania
|1887
|Semi-Weekly
|Times Pub. Co.
|align=center|
|-
!scope="row" style="text-align: left;"|Triad City Beat|Greensboro, Winston-Salem, High Point
|Guilford, Forsyth, Guilford
|2014
|Weekly, Thurs.
|Brian Clarey
|align=center|
|-
!scope="row" style="text-align: left;"|Tribune, The| Elkin, Jonesville
| Wilkes, Surry, Yadkin
| 1911
| Weekly
| Adams Publishing Group
|align=center| 
|-
!scope="row" style="text-align: left;"|Wake Weekly, The| Wake Forest
|Franklin/ Wake
| 1947
| Weekly (Thurs)
| Restoration Newsmedia
|align=center|
|-
!scope="row" style="text-align: left;"|Wallace Enterprise,  The|Wallace
|Duplin
| 192?
|Semi-Weekly (Mon., Thurs.)
|Wells-Oswald Pub. Co.
|align=center|
|-
!scope="row" style="text-align: left;"|Warsaw-Faison News, The|Warsaw
|Duplin
| 195?
|Weekly
|H.L. Oswald, III
|align=center|
|-
!scope="row" style="text-align: left;"|Warren Record, The| Warrenton
|Warren
| 1896
| Weekly (Wed.)
| Womack Publishing Company
|align=center|
|-
!scope="row" style="text-align: left;"|Watauga Democrat|Boone
|Watauga
| 1888
| Semi-Weekly (Wed., Sun.)
| Adams Publishing Group
|align=center|
|-
!scope="row" style="text-align: left;"|Wayne-Wilson News Leader|Fremont
|Wayne
|1983
|Weekly
|Merrill Pub. Co.
|align=center|
|-
!scope="row" style="text-align: left;"|Weekly Post, The|Locust
|Stanly
| 1974
|Weekly
|Weekly Post, Inc.
|align=center|
|-
!scope="row" style="text-align: left;"|West Craven Highlights|Vanceboro
|Craven
|1978
|Weekly
|unknown
|align=center|
|-
!scope="row" style="text-align: left;"|Wilkes Journal-Patriot| North Wilkesboro
|Wilkes
| 1906
| Tue., Fri.
| Carter-Hubbard Publishing
|align=center|
|-
!scope="row" style="text-align: left;"|Yadkin Ripple, The| Yadkinville
|Yadkin
| 1892
| Weekly, Thurs.
| Adams Publishing Group
|align=center|
|-
!scope="row" style="text-align: left;"|Yes! Weekly|Greensboro
|Guilford
| 2005
|Weekly
|Womack Newspapers
|align=center|
|}

Notes:

Facebook News Sites:
Most newspapers now have official Facebook pages that contain news articles and allow consumers to post comments about the news. The About'' tab on these pages often contains information about the establishment of the newspaper, location of the headquarters, ownership, staff, and links.

Statewide news organizations
The North Carolina Press Association (NCPA) was formed in 1873.  It supports newspapers, readership and advertisers throughout the state.  Membership includes 155 of the North Carolina newspapers, as of 2020.

The North Carolina Press Foundation was formed in 1995.  It is a non-profit organization supporting journalists.

See also
 List of radio stations in North Carolina
 List of television stations in North Carolina
 List of African-American newspapers in North Carolina (current and defunct)
 :Category:Journalists from North Carolina
 University of North Carolina School of Media and Journalism, Chapel Hill
 North Carolina literature

North Carolina media by city or county:
Asheville
Boone
Carteret County
Charlotte
Durham
Eden
Fayetteville
Greensboro
High Point
Morehead City
Raleigh
Statesville
Wilmington
Wilson
Winston-Salem

References

Bibliography

 
 
  (Directory ceased in 2017)
 
  (Includes North Carolina newspapers)

External links
 . (Survey of local news existence and ownership in the 21st century)

North Carolina
 
Newspapers
Newspapers
Mass media in North Carolina
 List of newspapers